The Immediate Geographic Region of Janaúba is one of the 7 immediate geographic regions in the Intermediate Geographic Region of Montes Claros, one of the 70 immediate geographic regions in the Brazilian state of Minas Gerais and one of the 509 of Brazil, created by the National Institute of Geography and Statistics (IBGE) in 2017.

Municipalities 
It comprises 11 municipalities.

 Jaíba     
 Janaúba     
 Manga  
 Matias Cardoso    
 Miravânia     
 Nova Porteirinha     
 Pai Pedro     
 Porteirinha     
 Riacho dos Machados  
 Serranópolis de Minas    
 Verdelândia

References 

Geography of Minas Gerais